Pyroderces urantha is a moth in the family Cosmopterigidae. It is found in Taiwan.

References

Natural History Museum Lepidoptera generic names catalog

urantha
Moths described in 1914